Catrin Jones (born 13 June 1999) is a British weightlifter. She won the gold medal in the women's 48 kg division at the 2015 Commonwealth Youth Games and claimed the corresponding national senior title the following year.

She represented Wales at the 2018 Commonwealth Games in Gold Coast, participating in the Women's 53 kg event and finishing in 11th place.

At the 2021 European Junior & U23 Weightlifting Championships in Rovaniemi, Finland, she won the bronze medal in her event. She won the gold medal in her event at the 2022 European Junior & U23 Weightlifting Championships held in Durrës, Albania.

References

External links
 
 

1999 births
Living people
Welsh female weightlifters
Commonwealth Games competitors for Wales
Weightlifters at the 2022 Commonwealth Games
Place of birth missing (living people)
21st-century British women